Ian Rafferty (born September 2, 1976) is a former American football offensive lineman. He played college football at North Carolina State. In total, Rafferty played five times for New York Jets

References

External links
Just Sport Stats

1976 births
Living people
American football offensive linemen
NC State Wolfpack football players
New York Jets players
Amsterdam Admirals players